A3 Basket is a women's basketball club in Umeå, Sweden. The club was established with the 2012 squad from KFUM Umeå women's basketball section "Umeå Comets" after the club had decided to discontinue their women's team. A new club was formed under the name Umeå BasketBollklubb (Umeå BBK). Debuting in Basketligan dam during the 2012–13 season, the team ended up fifth and made it to the semifinals, before losing to the Norrköping Dolphins. The club also plays in the BWBL.

Name
The official association name (föreningsnamn) is still Umeå BasketBollklubb (Umeå BBK) but the name rights has been sold twice. As the main sponsor for Umeå BBK, the company UDOMiNATE Sweden AB made a deal with Umeå BBK about its name and during most of the 2010s the club has been known as Udominate Basket. In 2018 however the telecom company A3 Sverige AB bought the name rights and the club has since been known as A3 Basket.

Season by season

References

External links
Official website

2012 establishments in Sweden
Basketball teams established in 2012
Basketball teams in Sweden
Sport in Umeå